Rhochmopterum neuropteripenne is a species of tephritid or fruit flies in the genus Rhochmopterum of the family Tephritidae.

Distribution
Tanzania.

References

Tephritinae
Insects described in 1910
Diptera of Africa
Taxa named by Paul Gustav Eduard Speiser